Hinna Fotball is the association football section of the Norwegian sports club Hinna IL from Stavanger.

The men's football team currently plays in the 3. divisjon, the fourth tier of the Norwegian football league system. The team was newly promoted in 2016, and before that had a stint in the 3. divisjon from 2009 to 2012.

References

 Official site 

Football clubs in Norway
Sport in Stavanger
Association football clubs established in 1917
1917 establishments in Norway